The 2013 Colonial Athletic Association men's soccer season was the 18th season of men's varsity soccer in the conference. The season marked the first for the incoming Charleston Cougars. The 2013 CAA Men's Soccer Tournament was played at Vidas Field on the campus of regular-season champion Drexel in Philadelphia.

The defending regular season champions were the Drexel Dragons. The Northeastern Huskies were the defending tournament champions. Drexel successfully defended its regular-season title from last season, and also added the conference tournament crown.

Changes from 2012 

 The College of Charleston joined the CAA from the Southern Conference. 
 George Mason left the CAA for the Atlantic 10 Conference. 
 Georgia State left the CAA for the Sun Belt Conference, which does not sponsor the sport. The program will compete as an independent team. 
 Old Dominion left the CAA for Conference USA.
 Towson dropped men's soccer due to budget concerns.

Season outlook

Teams

Stadiums and locations

Standings 
2013 CAA men's soccer standings

CAA Tournament 

The format for the 2013 CAA Men's Soccer Tournament will be announced in the Fall of 2013.

Results

Statistics

References 

 
2013 NCAA Division I men's soccer season